Czeladź Mała  is a village in the administrative district of Gmina Jemielno, within Góra County, Lower Silesian Voivodeship, in south-western Poland. Prior to 1945 it belonged to Germany under the name Tscheltsch, from 1936 to 1945 the village was called Ursiedel.

References

Villages in Góra County